College Park (previously "College Town") is a small, leafy, residential eastern suburb of Adelaide, South Australia in the City of Norwood Payneham St Peters. It is among the most expensive suburban areas in South Australia, with a median sale price of 1.8 million as of 2015.

History
 College Park Post Office opened on 21 October 1946.
 Lionel Logue was born in this suburb on 26 February 1880.

Heritage listings

College Park contains a number of heritage-listed sites, including:

 1-13 Payneham Road: Bon Marche Building
 15 Payneham Road: Bell's Plumbers Shop
 9 Trinity Street: Airlie Hostel

References

Suburbs of Adelaide